Kalyanpur-Pramodenagar is one of the 60 Legislative Assembly constituencies of Tripura state in India. It is in Khowai district and a part of East Tripura Lok Sabha constituency.

Members of Legislative Assembly
 2003:  Animesh Debbarma, Indigenous Nationalist Party of Twipra
 2008:  Aghore Debbarma, Communist Party of India (Marxist)
 2013:  Manindra Chandra Das, Communist Party of India (Marxist)

Election results

2018

See also
List of constituencies of the Tripura Legislative Assembly
 Khowai district
 Tripura East (Lok Sabha constituency)

References

Khowai district
Assembly constituencies of Tripura